Robert James Miller (October 14, 1983 – January 25, 2008) was a United States Army Special Forces soldier who posthumously received the Medal of Honor for his actions during the War in Afghanistan.

Military career
Miller was born in Pennsylvania, the second of eight children, and grew up in Illinois. His family had a tradition of military service stretching back to the Revolutionary War. He attended one year at University of Iowa before deciding to join the Army. He enlisted as a Special Forces trainee on August 14, 2003 and graduated from Infantry Basic Training and Airborne School at Fort Benning, Georgia, on January 6, 2004. Miller graduated from the Special Forces Assessment and Selection phase on September 26, 2004, and the Special Forces Weapons Sergeant Course on March 4, 2005. Miller received his Special Forces Tab and was promoted to sergeant after graduating from the Special Operations French Language Training Course, September 30, 2005. He was assigned the same day to Company A, 3rd Battalion, 3rd Special Forces Group (Airborne), Fort Bragg, North Carolina.

Miller deployed to Afghanistan in support of Operation Enduring Freedom from August 2006 to March 2007, which spanned both Consolidation I and Consolidation II. During this deployment, Miller received two Army Commendation Medals with Valor device for his courage under fire. While his language training was in French, he also learned to speak Pashto to better communicate with their Afghan Allies. Teammates recalled that he epitomized the Special Forces soldier "Him just spending time, not just time training but time after the sun goes down, drinking chai with them, eating, speaking with them in Pashto...He was what I pictured a Special Forces soldier [should be]". After returning stateside, he attended and completed Ranger School. In October 2007, he returned to Afghanistan for his second tour as weapons sergeant for his team. Miller was killed in combat with the Taliban in Afghanistan on January 25, 2008. His unit was conducting combat operations near the village of Barikowt, Nari District, Kunar Province, Afghanistan. He is buried at All Faiths Memorial Park in Casselberry, Florida. Miller's special skill decorations include: Special Forces Tab, Ranger Tab and Parachutist Badge.

Miller was inducted as a Laureate of The Lincoln Academy of Illinois and awarded the Order of Lincoln (the State's highest honor) by the Governor of Illinois in 2012 in the area of Government.

Medal of Honor
On January 25, 2008, ODA 3312 embarked on a pre-dawn joint combat patrol with Afghan National Security Forces in the Kunar Province near the Pakistan border. Twice along their route, they were forced to use demolitions to remove boulders blocking the road. Knowing that these were often used to effect ambushes, the patrol detached a dismounted element, with Miller taking point, to provide overwatch for the vehicles. Upon reaching the target area, they identified enemy positions with a drone, then initiated contact. Miller began laying down fire from his vehicle's MK 19 grenade launcher; when it was disabled, he switched to the mounted M240 machine gun, all the while identifying enemy positions for an airstrike. Following the airstrike the patrol moved forward to perform a bomb damage assessment (BDA). As the only SF member who spoke Pashto, Miller organized the Afghan fighters and took point once again. While crossing an exposed area, insurgents dug-in behind cover sprung an ambush and poured rifle, machine gun, and rocket-propelled grenade fire down at them.

Their team was caught with little to no cover while insurgent reinforcements arrived, swelling the enemy to nearly 150 fighters. Instead of retreating, Miller charged forward and eliminated a machine gun team and several fighters who were keeping his teammates pinned. Seeing that his team was still in danger, he charged forward again using his M249 SAW and fragmentation grenades to kill and/or wound at least 10 insurgents. Only once his team had found cover did he begin to pull back. As he maneuvered, Miller was wounded in the chest. Around this time, his team's commander had also been seriously wounded in the chest and shoulder and called for their forces to fall back. Instead, Miller pushed the fight, engaging the enemy and drawing their fire so his captain could be pulled to safety. Cut off and alone, Miller continued to push the fight, calling out enemy positions for his teammates while engaging them until he had expended all of his SAW ammo and his last grenade. He was still alive when two teammates got to his position and began to provide medical care but died moments later. In all, the firefight lasted seven hours and required a quick reaction force's reinforcements and additional close air support to finish the engagement. The enemy suffered 40+ dead and 60+ wounded of which Miller himself killed 16+ and wounded 30+. His courageous actions saved his 8 man team and the 15 Afghans with them.

Awards
Staff Sergeant Miller's decorations include:

Medal of Honor citation

The President of the United States of America, authorized by act of Congress, March 3, 1863, has awarded, in the name of the Congress, the MEDAL OF HONOR posthumously to

for service as set forth in the following

See also
List of Post Vietnam Medal of Honor recipients

References

External links

Staff Sergeant Robert J. Miller – Medal of Honor, Operation Enduring Freedom Archived on 3 December 2021
General Orders No. 2012–19 Award of the Medal of Honor to Staff Sergeant Robert J. Miller Archived on 4 March 2016
Video representation of the battle

1983 births
2008 deaths
People from Harrisburg, Pennsylvania
People from Wheaton, Illinois
United States Army soldiers
Members of the United States Army Special Forces
American military personnel killed in the War in Afghanistan (2001–2021)
United States Army Medal of Honor recipients
War in Afghanistan (2001–2021) recipients of the Medal of Honor
United States Army personnel of the War in Afghanistan (2001–2021)